Feline is the debut studio album by English singer Ella Eyre. It was released on 28 August 2015 through Virgin EMI Records. The album was produced by Jarrad Rogers, Dave Tozer, Ilya, Oscar Görres, Alexander Kronlund, DJ Fresh and Sigma. It was preceded by the UK top-twenty singles "If I Go", "Comeback" and "Together".

Promotion

Singles
"If I Go" was released as the album's lead single on 13 July 2014. It peaked at number 16 on the UK Singles Chart.
"Comeback" was released on 28 September 2014 as the album's second single. The song reached number 12 on the UK Singles Chart.
The third single, "Together", was released on 17 May 2015 and reached number 12 in the UK.
"Good Times" was released as the fourth single from the album on 21 August 2015, and peaked at number 37 on the UK Singles Chart.

Additionally, two other songs off the album were released as singles – "Deeper" was released on 15 December 2013, charting at number 72 in the UK, while "Gravity" was released on 8 February 2015 as a single from DJ Fresh's upcoming fourth studio album and reached number four on the UK Singles Chart.

Tour
There were three legs to Eyre's 'Feline Tour'.

Setlist for Tour 1:

 
 
 
 
 
 
 
 
 ""

Setlist for Tour 2:

 
 
 
 
 
 
 
 
 ""
 
 
 
 ""

Setlist for Tour 3:

 
 
 
 ""
 
 
 
 
 
 
 
 ""
 
 
 ""
 
 ""

Track listing

Notes
 The deluxe edition is repackaged into a Digipak.

Charts

Certifications

Release history

References

2015 debut albums
Albums produced by Chris Loco
Albums produced by Dave Tozer
Albums produced by Greg Wells
Albums produced by Ilya Salmanzadeh
Albums produced by Mark Taylor (music producer)
Albums produced by Steve Robson
Ella Eyre albums